Washington Township is one of twelve townships in Clark County, Indiana. As of the 2010 census, its population was 1,702 and it contained 744 housing units.

History
Washington Township was organized in 1816.

Geography

Cities and towns
 New Washington

Unincorporated towns
 Nabb

Adjacent townships
 Saluda Township, Jefferson County (northeast)
 Bethlehem Township (east)
 Owen Township (south)
 Oregon Township (west)
 Lexington Township, Scott County (northwest)

Major highways
  Indiana State Road 62
  Indiana State Road 362

Cemeteries
The township contains several cemeteries: Adams (a.k.a. Fifer), Barnes, Barnes Community House, Britan Cemetery (a.k.a. Pisgah), Crown Hill, Fouts/Robison, Frazier Family, Glass Family, Grayfriar-McMillen, Lawrence, Izzard, New Washington Christian Church, Staples, Work (a.k.a. Bower-Work Henly-Work)

References
 United States Census Bureau cartographic boundary files
 U.S. Board on Geographic Names

External links
 Indiana Township Association
 United Township Association of Indiana

Townships in Clark County, Indiana
Townships in Indiana
Populated places established in 1816
1816 establishments in Indiana